Avenida Juan Ponce de León, coextensive as Route PR-25 along its entire length, is one of the main thoroughfares in San Juan, Puerto Rico.

Route description
It is a mostly three-lane, one-way road. It runs from Old San Juan to Río Piedras pueblo and, for most of its length, it is a three- or four-lane road traversing the Isleta de San Juan corridor. The section running through Río Piedras pueblo is the only section that is not a multi-lane roadway.

Urban landscape
Institutional, cultural and other notable buildings predominate along the thoroughfare and it is considered as one of the main arteries in shopping errands, community participation, cultural activities and of personnel training of the city, it also constitutes an attraction for its architecture.

A stretch of Avenida Ponce de León has been designated as the arts district. It starts in Miramar and continues towards Hato Rey for 4 miles.

Major intersections

Related route

Puerto Rico Highway 25R (abbreviated Ramal PR-25 or PR-25R) is a one way avenue in San Juan.

See also

 Carretera Central (Puerto Rico)
 List of highways numbered 25
 List of streets in San Juan, Puerto Rico

References

External links

 Anuncia convocatoria de arte urbano en Avenida Ponce de León 
 CBA de Santurce hace realidad el Pórtico de las Artes 

Streets in San Juan, Puerto Rico
025